"How Can I Tell Her It's Over" is a song written by Barry Mann and Cynthia Weil and performed by Andy Williams.  The song reached #17 on the adult contemporary chart and #109 on the Billboard chart in 1966.

References

1966 singles
Songs written by Barry Mann
Andy Williams songs
Columbia Records singles
1966 songs
Songs with lyrics by Cynthia Weil